Eric M. Barendt is the Goodman Professor of Media Law at University College London. After graduating with a BCL and an MA degree at Oxford, Barendt was called to the Bar at Gray's Inn. He began lecturing in law as a fellow at St Catherine's College, Oxford in 1971. In 1990 he left Oxford to take up a position as Goodman Professor of Media Law at University College London, the first media law professorship in the United Kingdom. He also teaches jurisprudence at the undergraduate level. He has been a visiting professor at Sapienza University of Rome, the University of Siena, the University of Melbourne, and Panthéon-Assas University.

Writings
 Freedom of Speech, 2007, 
 Academic Freedom and the Law: A Comparative Study, 2010,

References

British legal scholars
Academics of University College London
Alumni of the University of Oxford
Living people
Members of Gray's Inn
Fellows of St Catherine's College, Oxford
Legal scholars of the University of Oxford
Year of birth missing (living people)